Paprat Peak is the ice-covered peak of elevation 650 m in Solvay Mountains on Brabant Island in the Palmer Archipelago, Antarctica.  It surmounts Koch Glacier to the east, Chiriguano Bay to the south and Jenner Glacier to the northwest.

The peak is named after the settlement of Paprat in Southern Bulgaria.

Location
British mapping in 1980 and 2008.

Maps
 Antarctic Digital Database (ADD). Scale 1:250000 topographic map of Antarctica. Scientific Committee on Antarctic Research (SCAR). Since 1993, regularly upgraded and updated.
British Antarctic Territory. Scale 1:200000 topographic map. DOS 610 Series, Sheet W 64 62. Directorate of Overseas Surveys, Tolworth, UK, 1980.
Brabant Island to Argentine Islands. Scale 1:250000 topographic map. British Antarctic Survey, 2008.

References
 Bulgarian Antarctic Gazetteer. Antarctic Place-names Commission. (details in Bulgarian, basic data in English)
 Paprat Peak. SCAR Composite Antarctic Gazetteer.

External links
 Paprat Peak. Copernix satellite image

Mountains of the Palmer Archipelago
Bulgaria and the Antarctic